The 1990 Australian Touring Car Championship was a CAMS sanctioned Australian motor racing title open to Group 3A Touring Cars. The championship, which was the 31st Australian Touring Car Championship, was promoted as the Shell Ultra Australian Touring Car Championship. It began on 25 February 1990 at Amaroo Park and ended on 15 July at Oran Park Raceway after eight rounds.

The title was won by Jim Richards, his third Australian Touring Car Championship victory. Richards drove for Nissan Motorsport Australia, utilising both Nissan Skyline HR31 GTS-R and the new Skyline R32 GT-R during one of the most competitive seasons in the history of the championship.

Teams and drivers

The following drivers and teams competed in the 1990 Australian Touring Car Championship.

Season review

The opening three rounds of the championship continued the story of the previous two seasons with the Ford Sierra RS500's of Dick Johnson Racing teammates Dick Johnson (winner of Symmons Plains and Phillip Island) and John Bowe dominating podiums with only the tight nature of the Amaroo Park layout giving another driver a look-in, namely the Nissan Skyline of Jim Richards who held off Bowe in a race long duel to win the season's opening round. Lakeside Raceway saw a complete upset with veteran Colin Bond winning his first ATCC race since 1978 from former teammate Peter Brock in his Mobil 1 Sierra and Holden Racing Team driver Win Percy in what would prove be Holden's only podium finish of the season. Englishman Percy, a former three time British Touring Car Champion, had taken over the role of team manager and lead driver of the HRT in 1990 and was contesting his first ATCC.

Colin Bond made it two in a row at Mallala after Mark Skaife's spectacular debut of Nissan's new , 4WD, twin turbo Skyline R32 GT-R, which was nicknamed "Godzilla", ended with a broken hub after storming to the lead in the early laps. As at Lakeside, Bond's steady, though unspectacular race pace paid off and as others fell away, his Caltex Sierra emerged in front. Peter Brock broke through for his first victory of the year at Wanneroo despite driving with falling turbo boost pressure for the last half of the race which actually helped minimise his tyre wear, while a broken axle to Johnson at Wanneroo saw his points lead surrendered to Richards who finished fourth in his first race of the new GT-R.

Ahead of the Oran Park Raceway Grand Finale, Richards held a three-point lead over two-time defending champion Johnson, with Bond and Brock still a chance being eleven and twelve points behind respectively. Bowe, winless despite his form, was too far behind even if he won and all other contenders retired. Richards, again in the GT-R, dominated Oran Park, making the points calculations irrelevant. Second place allowed Brock to slip past Johnson and Bond into the series runner's up position. After a poor start by Brock, who proved to be the only Sierra driver capable of matching Richards in the Nissan (though his fastest lap time proved to be almost 2 seconds slower than the Nissan), Richards drove away from the field. Behind Bowe, Longhurst was sixth after an inconsistent season ahead of Glenn Seton's improving Sierra. Percy was the best of the Holdens in eighth ahead of Alan Jones and Gregg Hansford who only had a partial season in Allan Moffat's Eggenberger Motorsport built Sierra.

For the first time since the ATCC changed from a single race to a series of races in 1969, the ATCC did not appear in Melbourne with neither Sandown or Calder hosting a round. The Phillip Island circuit, revived in 1989 for the Australian motorcycle Grand Prix which was a round of the 1989 Grand Prix motorcycle World Championship, held its first ATCC race since 1977.

Results and standings

Race results
The 1990 Australian Touring Car Championship consisted of 8 rounds with one race per round. Each race was slightly under one hour in duration.

Championship standings
Points were awarded on a 20–15–12–10–8–6–4–3–2–1 basis for the first ten outright positions in each race. The best seven race results counted for each driver's total.

See also
1990 Australian Touring Car season

References

External links
 Shell Ultra Australian Touring Car Championship - 1990, touringcarracing.net 
 Touring Cars 1990, autopics.com.au

Australian Touring Car Championship seasons
Touring Cars